is a mixed-use skyscraper in Akasaka, Minato, Tokyo.

Construction
Located at the center of the Tokyo Midtown development, Midtown Tower is the tallest of the six buildings located within the complex. At , it was the tallest building in Tokyo from the completion of primary construction in January 2007 until the completion of Toranomon Hills in 2014. Its official grand opening was on March 31, 2007, though the offices had been open since February. The building was designed by Chicago-based architectural firm Skidmore, Owings and Merrill with help from Nikken Sekkei Ltd. and built by the Takenaka and Taisei Corporations.

Facilities
As a mixed-use facility, Midtown Tower's 54 floors are utilized in different ways. Several conference rooms occupy the entirety of the 4th floor. The 5th floor is the home of the Tokyo Midtown Design Hub, a gallery and space for exhibitions, collaborations and discussions by designers. Tokyo Midtown Medical Center is located on the 6th floor. This medical facility is the first Japan-based collaboration with Johns Hopkins University. Unlike similar supertall skyscrapers in the area such as Roppongi Hills Mori Tower, Midtown Tower's top 54th floor is not a visitors' observation deck but rather  houses building components and maintenance facilities.

Office tenants
Floors 7 to 44 are designated as commercial office space and house the offices of (among others):
 Bain & Company
 Blackstone Group
 Cisco Systems
 Fast Retailing
 Herbert Smith Freehills
 Hudson Soft (formerly)
 Nikko Asset Management
 State Street Bank
 Yahoo! Japan
Coupa Software

Ritz-Carlton, Tokyo
Floors 45 to 53 are home to Japan's second Ritz-Carlton hotel – the 247-room Ritz-Carlton Tokyo. The hotel offers many notable features including Japan’s most expensive Presidential Suite, available for $20,000 per night, and an "authentic" 200-year-old Japanese tearoom. Four works measuring 8.1 meters in height by American painter Sam Francis appear in the building's lobby, that, along with the second and third floors, is utilized by the hotel.

See also

 List of tallest structures in Japan

References

External links

 
 

Akasaka, Tokyo
Skyscraper office buildings in Tokyo
Office buildings completed in 2007
Buildings and structures in Minato, Tokyo
Skyscraper hotels in Tokyo
Skidmore, Owings & Merrill buildings